The Marilaque Highway, also known as Marikina–Infanta Highway, Marilaque Road, Marikina-Infanta Road, as well as its former name Marcos Highway, is a scenic mountain  highway that connects Metro Manila with Infanta, Quezon in the Philippines. Motorists colloquially refer to the road as Marilaque Highway, while online applications prefer to use the longer Marikina–Infanta Highway as its name.

The Marilaque Highway starts at the intersection with Katipunan Avenue in Quezon City, near its boundary with Marikina, as a physical continuation of Aurora Boulevard. It traverses the Marikina Valley and passes through Antipolo, where it intersects the Sumulong Highway at the Masinag Junction. After Masinag, the road starts its ascent towards the Sierra Madre mountain range passing through Tanay, Santa Maria in Laguna, and finally Infanta in Quezon. The road is famous for the frequent motorcycle racers who use the curvy mountainous roads for joyrides, frequently resulting in major accidents.

Route description

The Marilaque Highway starts as a physical continuation of Aurora Boulevard under Katipunan Flyover in Quezon City. Entering Marikina, the highway slightly curves at the intersection with Andres Bonifacio Avenue connecting the Marikina city proper, then crosses the Marikina River. The Diosdado Macapagal Bridge that connects with C-5 merges in front of SM City Marikina. The LRT Line 2 and the Cainta–Marikina subtransmission line of Meralco parallel and along the highway. The highway makes another slight curve away from Marikina as it enters Pasig. It soon runs over the Cainta–Marikina boundary, and then goes straight towards the Cainta–Antipolo boundary towards the Masinag Junction with Sumulong Highway, where it continues on to Cogeo in Antipolo. It starts its ascent towards the Sierra Madre mountain range and traverses the municipalities of Tanay in Rizal, Santa Maria in Laguna, and Infanta in Quezon. In Infanta, the highway ends at its intersection with Famy–Real–Infanta Road, just southwest of the town proper.

This highway is a divided road featuring U-turn slots, and bike lanes. Several establishments, like the Riverbanks Center, SM City Marikina, Ayala Malls Feliz, Robinsons Metro East, Sta. Lucia East Grand Mall, and SM City Masinag are primary landmarks accessible through the road. Meralco subtransmission lines line the Cainta-Masinag segment of the highway up to Santa Maria, Laguna until Infanta, Quezon.

From Antipolo to Infanta, Marilaque Highway is a standard 2-6 lane road divided by lane markings typical of national highways located in the provinces. Road size varies depending on the density of the location as well as the engineering district wherein numerous road widening may occur as determined by the DPWH.

Alternative names

Its section in Cainta and Antipolo, particularly from Masinag Junction to the Rizal–Metro Manila boundary, is officially known as Marikina Diversion Road, as it diverts motorists away from the city proper of Marikina. It is also known as Marilaque Highway, whereas Marilaque is an acronym of the areas it traverses: Marikina,  Rizal, Laguna, and Quezon. Street signs tend to bear the Marilaque name due to convenience and memorability. The road has become known for its motorcycle accidents.

Marilaque Highway or Marilaque Road is formerly known as Marcos Highway before being renamed, since it once used the name of former President Ferdinand Marcos before the name changed after the People Power Revolution.

Route numbers
Since 2014, with the implementation of the new route numbering system by the Department of Public Works and Highways (DPWH), its section from Katipunan Avenue to Sumulong Highway is a component of National Route 59 (N59) of the Philippine highway network. The rest of road is unnumbered and identified as a tertiary national road.

History
The Highway existed far back to the American colonial era as Highway 55 which included present-day Recto Avenue, Legarda Street, Magsaysay Boulevard and Aurora Boulevard.

Intersections

References 

Roads in Metro Manila
Roads in Rizal
Roads in Laguna (province)
Roads in Quezon
Sierra Madre (Philippines)